The St. Regis Mountain Fire Observation Station is a historic fire observation station located on Saint Regis Mountain at Santa Clara in Franklin County, New York. The tower is a prefabricated structure built by the Aermotor Corporation and provided a front line of defense in preserving the Adirondack Forest Preserve from the hazards of forest fires.

It was added to the National Register of Historic Places in 2005.

The tower was restored by a friends group that formed in 2013, and the tower was re-opened to the public in September 2016.

References

External links

 The Friends of St. Regis Mountain Fire Tower
 The Fire Towers of New York

Government buildings on the National Register of Historic Places in New York (state)
Government buildings completed in 1918
Towers completed in 1918
Buildings and structures in Franklin County, New York
Fire lookout towers in Adirondack Park
Fire lookout towers on the National Register of Historic Places in New York (state)
National Register of Historic Places in Franklin County, New York